Milan Ozren (born 5 August 1977) is a Bosnian retired football player. He worked as an assistant to manager Igor Janković at Borac Banja Luka in 2018.

International career
Ozren made 4 appearances for Bosnia and Herzegovina (2 unofficial), all of them at the January 2001 Millenium Cup: the match against Bangladesh there marked his international debut and his final international was against Serbia and Montenegro. He was the first player from the autonomous Republika Srpska to wear the colors of the "united" national team of Bosnia and Herzegovina and was deemed a traitor by the Borac fans ons his return.

References

External links

Profile - NFSBIH

1977 births
Living people
Association football central defenders
Bosnia and Herzegovina footballers
Bosnia and Herzegovina international footballers
FK Borac Banja Luka players
NK Domžale players
SC Rheindorf Altach players
FK Rudar Ugljevik players
FK Kozara Gradiška players
Premier League of Bosnia and Herzegovina players
Slovenian PrvaLiga players
Austrian Regionalliga players
First League of the Republika Srpska players
Bosnia and Herzegovina expatriate footballers
Expatriate footballers in Slovenia
Bosnia and Herzegovina expatriate sportspeople in Slovenia
Expatriate footballers in Austria
Bosnia and Herzegovina expatriate sportspeople in Austria